Four on the Floor is the second full-length album by Juliette and the Licks.

The follow-up to You're Speaking My Language, this album was released on October 2, 2006, in the UK, and later re-released with a bonus DVD featuring documentaries, live performances and music videos. It was released on July 24, 2007, in the US with two bonus tracks.

The first single, "Hot Kiss", was released on September 25, 2006, and the second single "Sticky Honey" was released in 2007. A remix of "Inside the Cage" can be heard in the video game Grand Theft Auto IV on the Radio Broker station.

Before this album began production, both Jason Morris (drummer) and Paul Ill (bass guitarist) left the band for more 'studio-based' work. Jason Womack recorded bass guitar and Dave Grohl recorded the drums. The new live drummer for the supporting tour was Ed Davis.

It was awarded a silver certification from the Independent Music Companies Association which indicated sales of at least 30,000 copies throughout Europe.

Track listing

Personnel
 Juliette Lewis - Lead vocals, executive producer
 Todd Morse - Guitar, backing vocals
 Kemble Walters - Guitar, synthesizer, rhodes, backing vocals
 Jason Womack - Bass guitar
 Dave Grohl - Drums, percussion
 Dylan Mclaren - Producer

References

2006 albums
Juliette and the Licks albums
The Militia Group albums
Garage punk albums